Dimitris Mytaras (18 June 1934 – 16 February 2017) was a Greek artist who is considered one of the important Greek painters of the 20th century.

His work was mainly inspired by the human figure, and a combination of naturalism and expressionism. From the 1960s onward, Mytaras moved in the direction of naturalism, while from 1975 an expressionistic approach became more and more marked in his output.

Biography

Dimitris Mytaras was born in 1934 in Chalcis. From 1953 till 1957, Mytaras studied at the Athens School of Fine Arts under Yiannis Moralis. Later on he studied stage design at the Ecole Nationale Superieure des Arts Decoratifs in Paris. From 1964 till 1972, he directed the Interior Decoration Workshop of the Athens Technological Institute. Beginning in 1975, he taught at the Painting Workshop of the Athens School of Fine Arts. Mytaras participated in more than 30 international group shows, including the 1972 Venice Biennale. Mytaras died on 16 February 2017 in Athens following major health complications.

Works
During the time of the Greek military junta of 1967-1974, Mytaras sought to comment critically on Greek life through a series of realistic works entitled Photographic Documents.

In later life he turned towards classical themes.

Mytaras was selected to create one of the official posters for the 2004 Summer Olympics in Athens.

See also
 Art in modern Greece

References

External links
 Dimitris Mytaras at Euran Global Culture Networks
 Documentary Video About Mytara's life and work
 Euran Global Culture Networks
 Interview

1934 births
2017 deaths
People from Chalcis
Greek painters
Members of the Academy of Athens (modern)
Academic staff of the Athens School of Fine Arts